Football Club Breitenrain Bern are a football team from Bern, Switzerland.

The club was founded in 1994 as a merger of the clubs FC Minerva Bern and FC Zaehringia Bern, is currently playing in the Swiss Promotion League, the third tier of Swiss football.

Current squad 
As of 1 September 2022.

Staff and board members
 Trainer: Martin Lengen
 Goalkeeper Coach: Jon Gnehm
 Assistant Manager: Andreas Bachofner
 President: Stephan Siegenthaler

External links
 Official site

Association football clubs established in 1994
Breitenrain Bern
1994 establishments in Switzerland
Breitenrain Bern